Pazardzhik Great Synagogue, Pazardzhik Small Synagogue are non-functioning synagogues located in Pazardzhik, Bulgaria.

History of the Jews in Pazardzhik 
The earliest record of Judaism in Pazardzhik was in 1580 mentioned in an Ottoman register. In 1614, there were 7 households. That number grew to 10 between 1635 and to 41 between 1696-1697. Around 1888, the Jews were 1,277, the highest number in the history of Jews in the city. In 1945, the Jews were up to 826 (303 males, 322 females, 201 children). Their main occupations were trading and carpentry. There were 121 traders, 36 craftsmen and 35 clerks.

There were many Zionist political organizations established in the autumn of 1944, such as ''Dr. M. Nahamzon'' and ''WIZO''. The biggest one was Nahamzon, which united other Zionist organizations.

Great Synagogue 
The larger and older synagogue was built in 1850. Its architect is Stavri Temelkov, apart of the Bratsigovo architect school. It is believed in the same location that there was a previous synagogue constructed in the 17th century and burnt in the first half of the 19th century. Due to the mass emigration of Jews in Bulgaria, the synagogue is left to be not used for their intended purpose. In 1972, the synagogue is closed and used by the regional museum. In 1979, it was completely renovated and then brought back to the Jewish community in Pazardzhik.

Small Synagogue 
The smaller synagogue was constructed in 1872. From 1954 to 1979, the synagogue was used as a library for the local historical museum.

References

Bibliography 

 

Structures in Pazardzhik
Synagogues in Bulgaria